Charles Henri Félicité Sapinaud de la Rairie (December 30, 1760 - August 12, 1829) was a French soldier and Vendéen general during the war in the Vendée.

Life 
Sapinaud was born in La Gaubretière. In 1778, he enlisted as cadet gentilhomme in the Foix regiment (later renamed 83rd infantry regiment). He resigned from the army in 1789 as a lieutenant, and retires to his lands at La Gaubretière where he is elected mayor.

In March 1793, the war in the Vendée breaks loose and Sapinaud joins the insurgents serving under his uncle Charles Sapinaud de La Verrie, himself under the orders of Charles de Royrand, chief general of the Vendéens of the Catholic and Royal army of the Centre which originated from the east side of the Vendée department. Sapinaud de la Verrie was killed on 25 July 1793 near Chantonnay; Sapinaud de La Rairie succeeded him.

In October, Sapinaud follows the Vendéen army during the Virée de Galerne, yet he is separated from the army at the Battle of Le Mans on December 13, 1793. Lost after the routing, he manages to gain military Vendée.

Royrand died on November 5 after sicknesses and wounds, Sapinaud hence leads the Catholic and Royal Army of the Centre and fights the infernal columns during the first months of 1794. Along with François de Charette, Jean-Nicolas Stofflet and Gaspard de Bernard de Marigny, he is one of the main Vendéen generals.

In April 1794, the four generals who were until then fighting separately, sign a treaty of assistance. Yet Charette and Stofflet quickly get in disputes with Marigny who decides to part from the army. A military court thus condemns Marigny to death but Sapinaud refuses to vote for his execution. Marigny is eventually shot by Stofflet's men on July 10, 1794.

By the end of 1794, the Vendéens and Republicans negotiate and sign the Treaty of La Jaunaye that Sapinaud signs with Charette of February 17, 1795. The fragile peace is broken a few months later and Sapinaud joins the war once more on October 3, 1795. His troops are strongly diminished, and Stofflet is executed by the Republicans on February 25, 1796, followed by Charette on March 29. Sapinaud then leading only a few dozen men signs the peace in Nantes at the end of January 1796.

He marries in 1797 with Marie-Louise Charette.

The war resumes on October 15, 1799 and Sapinaud retakes the command of his army, yet on November 9 the coup of 18 Brumaire which overthrows the French Directory disconcerts the Vendéens and Chouans who begin negotiations in December. The peace conditions proposed by Napoleon Bonaparte divide the chouan and Vendéen generals, but Sapinaud sides for peace. He signs for peace on January 18, 1800.

In 1814, Napoleon is defeated and the monarchy is restored. Sapinaud is named lieutenant-general.

Sapinaud takes arms during the Hundred Days, during the War in the Vendée and Chouannerie of 1815. After the death of Louis du Vergier de La Rochejaquelein, Sapinaud succeeds him on June 10, 1815 at the head of the Catholic and Royal Army of Vendée, yet he resigns after a few days and names Charles d'Autichamp as his successor. After the defeat of the Vendéens at the battle of Rocheservière, Sapinaud sides again for peace.

After the Second Restoration, Sapinaud became a duke and Pair de France. He died on August 12, 1829 at La Gaubretière.

Sources
Émile Gabory, Les Guerres de Vendée, Robert Laffont, édition de 2009, p. 1443.

1760 births
1829 deaths
People from Vendée
Dukes of France
Royalist military leaders of the War in the Vendée
Order of Saint Louis recipients
 Cent
Peers of France